This is a list of cities, towns and settlements in Greenland.

The English term 'city' hardly applies to any populated area in Greenland (although several places in Greenland are considered "cities"), as the most populated place is Nuuk with 14,501 inhabitants. In Greenland they distinguish two kinds of settled areas: by (Danish for 'town') and bygd (Danish for 'settlement'). The seat of each municipality is a by, whereas every other settlement in a municipality is a bygd. A bygd can have anything from one to about five hundred inhabitants. Many places have Danish names in addition to the Greenlandic names. The Danish name, when applicable, is shown in parentheses.

The first list shows a ranked list of all towns with more than 1000 population. The second list
is ordered by region and municipality and includes all with more than 50 population plus some of the even smaller settlements.

Towns in Greenland with more than 1,000 population (cities) (2005)

Nuuk (Godthåb) Pop. 14,501
Sisimiut (Holsteinsborg) Pop. 5,965
Ilulissat (Jakobshavn) Pop. 4,533
Qaqortoq (Julianehåb) Pop. 3,144
Aasiaat (Egedesminde) Pop. 3,100
Maniitsoq (Sukkertoppen) Pop. 2,859
Tasiilaq (Ammassalik) Pop. 1,848
Paamiut (Frederikshåb) Pop. 1,817
Narsaq Pop. 1,764
Nanortalik (Bjørnessted) Pop. 1,509
Uummannaq Pop. 1,366
Qasigiannguit (Christianshåb) Pop. 1,320
Upernavik (Forårssted) Pop. 1,178

Towns and settlements in Kitaa (West Greenland)

Southern Kitaa

Nanortalik municipality

Nanortalik
Narsarmijit (Frederiksdal)
Alluitsup Paa (Sydprøven)
Tasiusaq
Aappilattoq
Ammassivik
Qorlortorsuaq (population 13 as of 2009)

Qaqortoq municipality
Qaqortoq (Julianehab)
Eqalugaarsuit
Saarloq
Qassimiut

Narsaq Municipality
Narsaq
Narsarsuaq
Qassiarsuk

South-Central Kitaa

Paamiut Municipality
Paamiut (Frederikshåb)
Arsuk

Nuuk Municipality
Nuuk (Godthåb)
Qeqertarsuatsiaat
Kapisillit

Central Kitaa

Maniitsoq Municipality
Maniitsoq (Sukkertoppen)
Kangaamiut
Atammik
Napasoq

Sisimiut Municipality
Sisimiut (Holsteinsborg)
Kangerlussuaq (Søndre Strømfjord)
Itilleq
Sarfannguit

Northern Kitaa

Kangaatsiaq municipality
Kangaatsiaq
Niaqornaarsuk
Attu
Iginniarfik
Ikerasaarsuk

Aasiaat municipality
Aasiaat (Egedesminde)
Kitsissuarsuit
Akunnaaq

Qasigiannguit municipality
Qasigiannguit (Christianshåb)
Ikamiut

Ilulissat municipality
Ilulissat (Jakobshavn)
Saqqaq
Qeqertaq
Ilimanaq (Claushavn)
Oqaatsut (Rodebay)

Qeqertarsuaq municipality
Qeqertarsuaq (Godhavn)
Kangerluk

Uummannaq municipality
Uummannaq
Ikerasak
Saattut
Qaarsut
Ukkusissat
Illorsuit
Nuugaatsiaq
Niaqornat

Upernavik Municipality
Upernavik
Kullorsuaq
Nuussuaq (Kraulshavn)
Innaarsuit
Tasiusaq
Naajaat
Aappilattoq
Kangersuatsiaq
Upernavik Kujalleq

Towns and settlements in Tunu (East Greenland)

Ammassalik municipality
Tasiilaq (Ammassalik)
Kuummiut
Isortoq
Tiniteqilaaq
Kulusuk (Kap Dan)
Sermiligaaq
Ikkatteq (population 1 as of 2005)

Ittoqqortoormiit municipality
Ittoqqortoormiit (Scoresbysund)
Itterajivit (Illukasiit/Kap Hope, population 9 as of 2005)

Ivittuut municipality
Ivittuut (former main centre, now abandoned)
Kangilinnguit (Grønnedal)

Towns and settlements in Avannaa (North Greenland)
Qaanaaq (Thule)
Siorapaluk
Savissivik
Qeqertat (population 22 as of 2005)

See also
List of towns in Denmark
Greenland

External links
 Greenland in Figures 2005 Statistics Greenland. 3rd Edition, May 2005. ISSN 1604-7397 (PDF)
 Statistics Greenland: Population Statistics Grønlands befolkning pr. 1. januar 2005 (23.02.2005). Del 2. Statistics Greenland. Only available in Danish and Greenlandic. Downloaded January 2006. (PDF)
 Gazetteer of Greenland Compiled by Per Ivar Haug. UBiT, Universitetsbiblioteket i Trondheim, August 2005, .

 
towns in Greenland
Greenland

bs:Sela na Grenlandu
de:Liste der Siedlungen in Grönland
it:Lista di località della Groenlandia
hu:Grönland településeinek listája
nl:Lijst van plaatsen in Groenland
ro:Lista oraşelor din Groenlanda
simple:List of towns in Greenland
fi:Luettelo Grönlannin kylistä